The 2022 Rugby Europe Sevens Trophy was the second division of Rugby Europe's 2022 sevens season. This edition was hosted by the cities of Zagreb and Budapest on 11–12 June and 18–19 June. The two highest-placed teams were promoted to the 2023 Championship series. The two teams with the fewest points were relegated to the 2023 Conference.

Ukraine was due to participate in this competition but withdrew following the Russian invasion of Ukraine. Denmark who had been relegated in the 2021 Trophy tournament were awarded their place. Additionally, England, Ireland, and Wales participated in this tournament following their relegation from the Championship Series due to their failing to field teams in the 2021 Championship competition and instead participating in the postponed 2020 Summer Olympics which took place from 26 July to 31 July 2021.

The best team in the rankings at the end of the series that had not already qualified for the 2022 Rugby World Cup Sevens European Qualifier was added to that event to be held in Bucharest in July.

Ireland won the competition and were promoted to the Championship along with second-place finishers England. Latvia and Bulgaria were relegated to the Conference.

Schedule

Standings

First leg – Zagreb 
All times in Central European Summer Time (UTC+02:00)

First leg – Pool Stage

First leg – Pool A

First leg – Pool B

First leg – Pool C

First leg – Ranking of third-placed teams

First leg – Knockout stage

First leg – 9th–12th place playoff

First leg – 5th–8th place playoff

First leg – Cup finals

Second Leg – Budapest 
All times in Central European Summer Time (UTC+02:00)

Second Leg – Pool Stage

Second Leg – Pool A

Second Leg – Pool B

Second Leg – Pool C

Second Leg – Ranking of third-placed teams

Second Leg – Knockout stage

Second Leg – 9th–12th place playoff

Second Leg – 5th–8th place playoff

Second Leg – Cup finals

Notes

External links 
 Zagreb tournament page
 Budapest tournament page

References 

2022 rugby sevens competitions
2022 in Croatian sport
2022 in Hungarian sport
Sport in Zagreb
International sports competitions in Budapest
June 2022 sports events in Croatia
June 2022 sports events in Hungary